Erin R. Sheehan is an American politician, businesswoman, and former fashion designer serving as a member of the Maine House of Representatives from the 12th district. She assumed office on December 2, 2020.

Education 
Sheehan earned a Bachelor of Arts degree in geography and women's studies from the Clark University and an Associate of Applied Science degree in menswear design from the Fashion Institute of Technology. She was also a geology PhD candidate at the University of British Columbia.

Career 
Sheehan worked as a clothing designer for Tommy Hilfiger, John Varvatos, Evisu, Carter's, Fossil Group, and JCPenney. In 2019, she opned a wine bar with her husband in Biddeford, Maine. She was elected to the Maine House of Representatives in November 2020 and assumed office the following month.

References 

Year of birth missing (living people)
Living people
American fashion designers
Politicians from Biddeford, Maine
Women state legislators in Maine
Democratic Party members of the Maine House of Representatives
Clark University alumni
Fashion Institute of Technology alumni
University of British Columbia alumni